The 2019 SMU Mustangs men's soccer team represented the Southern Methodist University during the 2019 NCAA Division I men's soccer season and the 2019 American Athletic Conference men's soccer season. The regular season began on August 30 and concluded on November 5. It was the program's 45th season fielding a men's varsity soccer team, and their 7th season in the AAC. The 2019 season was Kevin Hudson's fifth year as head coach for the program.

SMU finished the season with an 18–2–1 overall record and a 5–1–1 conference record, second-best in the AAC. The Mustangs went on to win the AAC Tournament for the third-consecutive time and reached the quarterfinals of the NCAA Tournament for the first time since 2010.

Background 

The 2018 SMU Mustangs men's soccer team had a record of 10–5–3 overall and 5–1–1 in the AAC. The team beat UCF in the finals of the AAC Tournament to claim the program's second consecutive conference title. The Mustangs earned an automatic bid to the 2018 NCAA Division I Men's Soccer Tournament, where they were eliminated in the first round by Oregon State.

Player movement

Players leaving

Incoming transfers

High school recruits

Squad

Roster

Team management

Schedule 

|-
!colspan=6 style=""| Non-conference regular season
|-

|-
!colspan=6 style=""| American Athletic regular season
|-

|-
!colspan=6 style=""| American Athletic Tournament
|-

|-
!colspan=6 style=""| NCAA Tournament
|-

Statistics

Players

Goalies

Disciplinary record

Awards and honors

2020 MLS Super Draft

Rankings

See also 
 2019 SMU Mustangs women's soccer team

References 

2019
SMU Mustangs
SMU Mustangs
SMU Mustangs men's soccer
SMU Mustangs